The grand prix national des Lettres was created in 1950 by the French Ministry of Culture to recognize writers who have contributed to the influence of French literature. It has not been awarded since 1999.

List of laureates 

 1951: Émile Chartier, known as Alain
 1952: Valery Larbaud
 1953: Henri Bosco
 1954: André Billy
 1955: Jean Schlumberger
 1956: Alexandre Arnoux
 1957: Louis Martin-Chauffier
 1958: Gabriel Marcel
 1959: Saint-John Perse
 1960: Marcel Arland
 1961: Gaston Bachelard
 1962: Pierre-Jean Jouve
 1963: Jacques Maritain
 1964: Jacques Audiberti
 1965: Henri Michaux (refused)
 1966: Julien Green
 1967: Louis Guilloux
 1968: Jean Grenier
 1969: Jules Roy
 1970: Maurice Genevoix
 1971: Jean Cassou
 1972: Henri Petit
 1973: Jacques Madaule
 1974: Marguerite Yourcenar
 1975: André Dhôtel
 1976: Armand Lunel
 1977: Philippe Soupault
 1978: Roger Caillois
 1979: Marcel Brion
 1980: Michel Leiris (refused)
 1981: Pierre Klossowski
 1982: Nathalie Sarraute
 1983: Jean Genet
 1984: Jean Cayrol
 1985: André Pieyre de Mandiargues
 1986: Kateb Yacine
 1987: Robert Pinget
 1988: Maurice Nadeau
 1989: Jean-Toussaint Desanti
 1990: Louis-René Des Forêts
 1991: Béatrix Beck
 1992: Louis Calaferte
 1993: Jean Tardieu
 1994: Dominique Rolin
 1995: Marthe Robert
 1996: Patrick Modiano
 1997: not awarded
 1998: Michel Houellebecq and Jean Starobinski
 1999: Réjean Ducharme and François Cochet

External links 
 Grand Prix national des Lettres on the site of the Académie française
 Grand Prix national des Lettres on INA.fr (13 May 1953)

French literary awards
Awards established in 1950
1950 establishments in France